Ramazan Rragami (3 April 1944 – 15 January 2022) was an Albanian football player and coach. He played for the Albania national team and for Vllaznia Shkodër, becoming one of the club's most notable players of all time. He became a member of The Disciplinary Committee affiliated with The Albanian Football Federation.

Club career
Ramazan Rragami had a brilliant career as a player as well as a coach in the national and international arena. He started playing in his native town, Vllaznia, at the age of 16. He continued there until 1967 when he was recruited by the Partizani team of Tirana and played there until 1970. He returned to Vllaznia in 1970 and, in 1972, won both the league title and League Cup. In the final game of the League Cup, Rragami scored seven times from the penalty spot, twice during regular time and five additional penalty kicks after an aggregate tie. It is worth noting that this is the first and last time a player has scored all penalties for one team. FIFA regulations at that time allowed one player to execute all penalty kicks after a regular game tie. FIFA has since changed the rule and different players are now required to make the attempt. Rragami was part of a famous football threesome from Shkodër with Medin Zhega and Sabah Bizi.

International career
Rragami made his debut for Albania in a May 1965 FIFA World Cup qualification match against Switzerland and earned a total of 20 caps, scoring 1 goal, from 1965 to 1973. He was the lone goalscorer in Albania's first ever World Cup qualification win over Finland in 1973 and he played in the famous 0–0 draw with European powerhouse West Germany in December 1967.

His final international was a November 1973 FIFA World Cup qualification match against East Germany.

Managerial career
Rragami began his coaching career while he was still playing in 1972. Upon finishing his career as a player he started as a full-time coach with KS Vllaznia where he won the league in the 1982–1983 season. At the same time he was the assistant coach for the Albania national under-21 football team, which reached the quarter finals of the Euro 84. They became the first Albanian team in any level to qualify for a competitive tournament.

Ramazan Rragami then studied in Coverciano in Italy where he received his coaching certification in one of the most prestigious coaching schools in the world.

Personal life and death
Rragami died on 15 January 2022, at the age of 77.

Honours

As a player
 Albanian Superliga: 1972, 1974

As coach
 Albanian Superliga: 1983

References

External links

1944 births
2022 deaths
Footballers from Shkodër
Albanian footballers
Association football midfielders
Albania international footballers
KF Vllaznia Shkodër players
FK Partizani Tirana players
KF Skënderbeu Korçë players
Kategoria Superiore players
Albanian football managers
KF Vllaznia Shkodër managers
Albania national under-21 football team managers
Kategoria Superiore managers